Al-Shaykh Badr District is a district of the Tartus Governorate in northwestern Syria. Administrative centre is the town of al-Shaykh Badr. At the 2004 census, the district had a population of 52,981.

Sub-districts 
The district of al-Shaykh Badr is divided into three sub-districts or nawāḥī (population as of 2004):
Al-Shaykh Badr Subdistrict (ناحية الشيخ بدر): population 25,324.
Brummanet al-Mashayekh Subdistrict (ناحية برمانة المشايخ): population 13,562
Al-Qamsiyah Subdistrict (ناحية القمصية): population 14,095.

References